Peter Hollfelder (24 November 1930 – 6 December 2005) was a German classical pianist.

Life 
Born in Munich, supported by the Studienstiftung des deutschen Volkes, Hollfelder studied at the Hochschule für Musik und Theater München. His teachers were Franz Dorfmüller, Erik Then-Bergh and Friedrich Wührer. He made his debut in 1955 with the Münchner Philharmoniker. He found international recognition after piano recitals in the Tonhalle, Zürich and the Wigmore Hall.

In 1963, Hollfeder went to the Hochschule für Musik Würzburg, whose chair for piano he held until 1996.

Hollfelder died in Würzburg at the age of 75.

Work 
 Geschichte der Klaviermusik. Two volumes. Noetzel, Wilhelmshaven 1989, .
 Das große Handbuch der Klaviermusik.
 Lexikon Klaviermusik. Noetzel, Wilhelmshaven 1999, .
 Lexikon Klaviermusik. Supplement. Noetzel, Wilhelmshaven 2005, .
 Die Klaviermusik : historische Entwicklungen. Hamburg : Nikol Verl.-Ges., 1999, 
 Auftragsnetze. Munich: Siemens, 1973.

References

External links 
 
 

German male pianists
German classical pianists
Male classical pianists
1930 births
2005 deaths
Musicians from Munich
Academic staff of the Hochschule für Musik Würzburg
20th-century German male musicians